The 82d Aviation Regiment, part of the U.S. Army, has three battalions and one separate company under the Combat Aviation Brigade, 82d Airborne Division. The brigade also has the 1st Squadron, 17th Cavalry Regiment and the 122d Aviation Support Battalion. The lineages for the Combat Aviation Brigade, 82d Airborne Division and its subordinate units of the 82d Aviation Regiment, although often mistaken for one another, are separate.

History
Formed in 1957 as the 82nd Aviation Company and then later reorganized as the 82nd Aviation Battalion in 1960. The battalion became the first combat aviation battalion assigned to a division-sized unit in the U.S. Army. In 1987 the 82nd Aviation Battalion would again reorganized as the 82nd Aviation Brigade.

Since then, the “Wings of the Airborne” has always answered the nations call. Supporting operations in Vietnam, Desert Shield, Desert Storm, Dominican Republic, Panama, Grenade, the mountains of Afghanistan and the streets of Iraq.

Today’s modern 82nd Combat Aviation Brigade took shape in January 15, 2006. As the U.S. Army sought to better consolidate combat power through the Brigade Combat Team construct for its land forces, the aviation brigades underwent similar realignment to increase its capabilities.

Distinctive Unit Insignia
 Description
A Silver color metal and enamel device 1 1/8 inches in height overall consisting of a shield blazoned: Checky Azure and Argent, a chess knight in profile Sable between two wings displayed inverted Or. Attached below the shield is a Silver scroll inscribed "GROUND AIR MOBILITY" in Black letters.
 Symbolism
Ultramarine blue and golden orange are the colors used for Aviation. The checky field represents a chess board, symbolic of the battlefield, and refers to the strategy of war. The knight, considered the most versatile piece to guard and aid the queen, placed between wings, symbolizes the mission of the unit and its versatility.
 Background
The distinctive unit insignia was originally approved for the 82d Aviation Battalion on 8 February 1963. It was amended to change the color of the shield on 26 August 1981. The insignia was redesignated for the 82d Aviation Regiment with the description amended on 27 February 1987.

Coat of Arms

Blazon
 Shield
Checky Azure and Argent, a chess knight in profile Sable between two wings displayed inverted Or.
 Crest
From a wreath Argent and Azure, between two palm fronds Vert a pheon Or superimposed by a sword of the first hilted Gules.
Motto GROUND AIR MOBILITY.
 Symbolism
 Shield
Ultramarine blue and golden orange are the colors used for Aviation. The checky field represents a chess board, symbolic of the battlefield, and refers to the strategy of war. The knight, considered the most versatile piece to guard and aid the queen, placed between wings, symbolizes the missions of the unit and its versatility.
 Crest
The unit's campaign participation in Grenada is commemorated by the colors of the design elements (yellow, red and green) adapted from the flag of Grenada. The pheon alludes to attack capabilities, swiftness and accuracy in flight. The unsheathed sword symbolizes military preparedness and combat service. The red color of the hilt honors the organization's Meritorious Unit Commendation earned in Southwest Asia. The palm fronds represent victory and their two Southwest Asia campaigns: Defense of Saudi Arabia and the Liberation and Defense of Kuwait.
 Background
The coat of arms was originally approved for the 82d Aviation Battalion on 8 February 1963. It was amended to change the color of the shield on 26 August 1981. It was redesignated for the 82d Aviation Regiment on 27 February 1987. The coat of arms was amended to include a crest on 7 August 2003.

Current configuration of the Combat Aviation Brigade, 82d Airborne Division

  Headquarters and Headquarters Company (HHC), Combat Aviation Brigade, 82d Airborne Division "Pegasus"
  1st Battalion (Attack), 82d Aviation Regiment "Wolfpack" (AH-64E)
 HHC
 Company A 
 Company B 
 Company C 
 Company D 
 Company E

  2d Battalion (Assault), 82d Aviation Regiment "Corsair" (UH-60M)
 HHC "Checkmates"
 Company A "Redhawks
 Company B "Cavemen"
 Company C "Vipers"
 Company D "Dog Pound"
 Company E "Lancers"

  3d Battalion (General Support), 82d Aviation Regiment "Talons" (previously 3d Battalion, 229th Aviation Regiment)
 HHC
 Company A "Mustangs" (UH-60A/L)
 Company B "Flippers" (CH-47F)
 Company C "All American Dustoff" (HH-60M)
 Company D "Darkhorse"
 Company E
 Company F "Bad Boys"
  Company D, 82d Aviation Regiment, MQ-1C Gray Eagle (Inactivated 15 June 2006 as an Aviation Intermediate Maintenance (AVIM) unit and reflagged as the 122d Aviation Support Battalion, the lineage of Company D was reactivated as a separate MQ-1C Gray Eagle UAV unit on 16 February 2017. It is not assigned to any of the existing helicopter battalions of the brigade.)
  1st Squadron (Reconnaissance), 17th Cavalry Regiment "Saber" (AH-64E) – changed to AH-64E from OH-58D in 2017.
 Headquarters and Headquarters Troop
 Troop A 
 Troop B 
 Troop C 
 Troop D 
 Troop E 
 Troop F (UAS)
  122d Aviation Support Battalion "Atlas"
 HHC "Opinicus"
 Company A "Maximus"
 Company B "Phoenix"
 Company C "Oracle"

Decorations
  Meritorious Unit Commendation (Army) for Southwest Asia 
  Meritorious Unit Commendation (Army) for Afghanistan Operation Enduring Freedom 2009-2010

See also
 United States Army Aviation Branch
 Coats of arms of U.S. Army Aviation Regiments
 U.S. Army Regimental System

References

Bibliography

External links
 http://www.history.army.mil/html/forcestruc/lineages/branches/av/default.htm
 https://web.archive.org/web/20110512225727/http://www.armyavnmuseum.org/index.html

082
Military units and formations established in 1957